Nick Romeo Reimann (born 14 January 1998 in Munich) is a German actor.

Filmography

Awards and nominations

References

External links
 
 

1998 births
Living people
German male actors